is a passenger railway station located in the city of Tsuyama, Okayama Prefecture, Japan, operated by West Japan Railway Company (JR West).

Lines

Station layout
The station consists of two opposed ground-level side platforms.  The station building is located on the side of the platform bound for Tsuyama, and both platforms are connected by a level crossing.The station is unattended.

Platforms

Adjacent stations

History
Mimasaka-Kamo Station opened on March 15, 1928. With the privatization of the Japan National Railways (JNR) on April 1, 1987, the station came under the aegis of the West Japan Railway Company. The station building was renovated in June 2003.

Passenger statistics
In fiscal 2019, the station was used by an average of 71 passengers daily..

Surrounding area
 Okayama Prefectural Road/Tottori Prefectural Road No. 6 Tsuyama Chizu Hatto Line
Tsuyama City Kamo Junior High School
Tsuyama City Kamo Branch (former Kamo Town Office)

See also
List of railway stations in Japan

References

External links

  Mimasaka-Kamo Station Official Site

Railway stations in Okayama Prefecture
Railway stations in Japan opened in 1928
Tsuyama